Adam Shagai is a town in the Federally Administered Tribal Areas of Pakistan. It is located at 34°54'39N 71°28'0E with an altitude of 1211 metres (3976 feet).

References

Populated places in Khyber Pakhtunkhwa